Mikuláš Dzurinda (born 4 February 1955) is a Slovak politician who was the prime minister of Slovakia from 30 October 1998 to 4 July 2006. He is the founder and leader of the Slovak Democratic Coalition (SDK) and then the Slovak Democratic and Christian Union. From 2002 to 2006, his party formed a coalition government with the Christian Democratic Movement, the Alliance of the New Citizen and the Party of the Hungarian Coalition.

Mikuláš Dzurinda's 2nd government was labeled as a reformist and pro-market. Reforms included a flat tax of 19%, pension reform (second pillar), and education financing reform (except colleges and universities).

During his term, Slovakia joined both the European Union and NATO.

Dzurinda later served as Minister of Foreign Affairs in Prime Minister Iveta Radičová's coalition government from 2010 to 2012. On 3 December 2013, Dzurinda was elected as President of the Martens Centre, the think-tank of the European People's Party.

Early life

Dzurinda was born on 4 February 1956 in the eastern Slovak village of Spišský Štvrtok. He graduated from the College of Transport and Communications in Žilina in 1979. In 1988, he completed his post-graduate scientific research there and was awarded with a Candidate of Sciences (CSc.) degree. He worked for the Transport Research Institute (VÚD) in Žilina as an economic analyst (1979–1988). Later he was the director of an information technology section within the regional directorate of the Czechoslovak Railways (ČSD) in Bratislava (1988–1990).

Mikuláš Dzurinda is married and has two daughters. He speaks Slovak, Czech, English and French.

Dzurinda entered Slovak politics as one of the founding members of the Christian Democratic Movement (KDH), a conservative political party officially constituted in 1990. The first democratic general election in Czechoslovakia was held in 1990, and he was appointed Deputy Minister of Transportation and Posts of the Slovak Government in 1991. In 1992 he became a member of the Slovak parliament (National Council of the Slovak Republic) and worked as a member of the Committee for Budget and Finance. At the time of the split of Czechoslovakia and the establishment of an independent Slovakia (1993), he was KDH Deputy Chairman responsible for economy. During the tenure of Jozef Moravčík as Prime Minister (March–October 1994), Dzurinda was Minister of Transportation, Posts and Public Works. Following the 1994 general election, won by Vladimír Mečiar, he returned to the opposition as a member of the parliament.

Prime Minister 1998–2002

In response to the Election Act prepared and approved by Mečiar's government in 1997, five opposition parties (Christian Democratic Movement/KDH, Democratic Party/DS, Democratic Union/DU, Social Democratic Party of Slovakia/SDSS and the Green Party of Slovakia/SZS) formed the Slovak Democratic Coalition (SDK). Dzurinda became its spokesman, and later, on 4 July 1998, its chairman.

Dzurinda was appointed as Prime Minister for the first time in October 1998, leading five opposition parties united as the Slovak Democratic Coalition (SDK) and defeating the government of Vladimír Mečiar at the polls.

Under Dzurinda's leadership Slovakia managed to re-enter integration processes and registered a political comeback in relations both with the European Union and trans-Atlantic economic and political structures. The success of the reforms put through by his cabinet were best reflected in Slovakia's entry into the OECD in September 2000, completion of accession negotiations with the European Union and the entry of major investors into the Slovak market. The U.S. Steel investment, for example, came with a pledge to invest more than a billion dollars here over the next decade.

In January 2000 he founded a new political party, the Slovak Democratic and Christian Union (SDKÚ), which he has chaired since. In an intra-party election in March 2002, SDKU members confirmed his leading position and following the September 2002 general election he was given the opportunity to again form the Slovak government. The Party of the Hungarian Coalition (SMK), Christian Democratic Union (KDH) and the Alliance of the New Citizen (ANO) have joined the SDKU in the ruling coalition. The Free Forum split from the SDKU in early 2004.

Prime Minister 2002–2006

The reformist course of Dzurinda's policies was confirmed by a mandate he was given by electors in the 2002 general election to form his second government. It was also a year when the NATO Prague Summit in November decided on Slovakia's invitation to join NATO; and the country also completed accession talks with the EU at the Copenhagen Summit in December, thus launching its ratification process.

During this period the budget deficit has been reduced to less than 3 percent of GDP, and it opened the door for Slovakia to join the eurozone in 2009. Economic growth, higher than 6 per cent, has become the fastest in the region. Nevertheless, foreign investors has discovered the country, notably car companies such as PSA Peugeot-Citroën and Kia.

The government of Mikuláš Dzurinda has been praised by the World Bank as the best market reformer in the world. Flat tax rate 19 per cent for income, corporates and value added tax led Steve Forbes to call Slovakia an "investors' paradise". But country was still facing many challenges, especially in rural areas. Unemployment increased to 20 percent under Dzurinda's first government, and was still at 12% when he left office, one of the highest rates in Europe.

Dzurinda's party was defeated by SMER in the 2006 parliamentary election. SDKU-DS was second with more than 18 per cent of votes. Because of refusal to renew the right-wing coalition government with the support of Meciar's party he was not able to continue governing. SMER leader Robert Fico has formed a coalition government with Meciar's HZDS and Slota's Slovak National Party (SNS).

Dzurinda in opposition 2006–2010

Mikuláš Dzurinda has been a regular MP in the National Council of the Slovak Republic since his party's defeat in the 2006 parliamentary elections. In February 2008, Juraj Liška, SDKÚ-DS's deputy leader, openly asked Dzurinda to resign as the party leader due to the low party polls and the arguably undemocratic style of leadership. The members of the party praesidium denied Mr. Liška's accusations and since the praesidium assembly, Mr. Liška has been unwilling to speak out on the inner affairs of the party. This affair led to the open protests against Mr. Dzurinda from party members from Bratislava. Since their exclusion from the party by a regular party judge there are no longer any thrills in the party.

Foreign minister 2010–2012
Dzurinda was appointed foreign minister in the cabinet of prime minister Iveta Radičová on 9 July 2010.

He was again elected to be the chairman of the SDKÚ-DS party on 6 November 2010 for next four years. He was only one candidate, the incumbent prime minister Radičová (from the same party) declined the nomination for candidacy.

Public image
Dzurinda has been known for his enthusiasm for cycling and especially long distance running, cultivating an image of a healthy and competitive person. 

After the Dzurinda led-coalition defeated the autocratic Prime Minister Vladimír Mečiar, Dzurinda became unpopular with the People's Party - Movement for a Democratic Slovakia (ĽS-HZDS) electorate. While the media routinely covered ĽS-HZDS political meetings full of anti-Dzurinda rants, the most iconic representation of this antipathy was recorded by journalist Karol Lovaš at a ĽS-HZDS meeting in support of Gustav Krajči where a large group of 70- and 80-year-old citizens repeatedly shouted the slogan "Dzurinda is a Gypsy".

Internationally, Dzurinda is perceived as a successful and progressive politician, mostly due to the internationally acclaimed economic reforms his government implemented during Dzurinda's second government (2002–2006). In 2006 President of the United States George W. Bush called Dzurinda a friend and issued his admiration.

Other activities

Dzurinda has lectured at North American and European universities, and to both experts and public audiences. He is a strong advocate of trans-Atlantic ties. He has met and talked personally to leading foreign politicians, including U.S. presidents Bill Clinton and George W. Bush, German Chancellor Gerhard Schröder, British Prime Minister Tony Blair, European Commission President Romano Prodi, NATO Secretary General Lord George Robertson, and several influential US senators and congressmen. Under his leadership, the Visegrád Group—a co-operative grouping of the Czech Republic, Hungary, Poland and Slovakia—was revived and gained new stimuli.

Dzurinda serves on the Leadership Council for Concordia,a nonpartisan, nonprofit based in New York City focused on promoting effective public-private collaboration to create a more prosperous and sustainable future.

Dzurinda is a keen marathoner. He has taken part in the International Peace Marathon (MMM) in Košice 13 times, he ran the Lesser Carpathians Marathon (in 1986 in his personal best of 2 hours, 54 minutes and 57 seconds) and in 1996 the Rajec Marathon. In 2001, as Slovakia's premier he took part in the famous New York City Marathon, completing the 42.195-km course in 3 hours, 42 minutes. On 13 April 2003 he ran his second foreign marathon, held in London. He mended his final time at 3 hours 36 minutes. When speaking to the BBC presenter, he aired his hopes for a Slovakia as part of the EU, which occurred in 2004.

References
Originally copied with permission from http://www.vlada.gov.sk/dzurinda_en/ktoje/zivotopis.php3

External links
Official site. Includes CV, agenda and gallery.

|-

|-

1956 births
Living people
Foreign Ministers of Slovakia
Christian Democratic Movement politicians
People from Levoča District
Prime Ministers of Slovakia
Slovak Democratic and Christian Union – Democratic Party politicians
Slovak Democratic Coalition politicians
Members of the National Council (Slovakia) 1992-1994
Members of the National Council (Slovakia) 1994-1998
Members of the National Council (Slovakia) 2006-2010